Cymothoe magambae is a butterfly in the family Nymphalidae. It is found in Tanzania. The habitat consists of montane forests at altitudes between 1,700 and 2,200 meters.

Subspecies
Cymothoe magambae magambae (Tanzania: north to the Magamba Forest)
Cymothoe magambae pareensis Rydon, 1996 (Tanzania: South Pare Mountains)

References

Butterflies described in 1980
Cymothoe (butterfly)
Endemic fauna of Tanzania
Butterflies of Africa